The New Reign is the debut EP by American progressive metalcore band Born of Osiris. It was released on October 2, 2007 through Sumerian Records. The New Reign was written entirely by drummer Cameron Losch when he was 14–16 years old and produced by The Faceless guitarist Michael Keene. It is also the last release by the band with guitarist Matthew C. Pantelis. Pantelis went on to join deathcore band Veil of Maya after The New Reign.

Track listing

Personnel
Born of Osiris
 Ronnie Canizaro - lead vocals
 Matthew C. Pantelis - lead guitar
 Lee McKinney - rhythm guitar
 David Darocha - bass
 Joe Buras - keyboards, backing vocals 
 Cameron Losch - drums

Artwork and design
 Ash Avildsen - art direction, photography
 Mamah erni - Jait Baju

Production and recording
 Michael Keene & Pad Demolish - engineer, mastering, mixing, producer

References

2007 debut EPs
Born of Osiris albums
Sumerian Records albums